Anja Mischke (born 29 April 1967) is a former West German female speed skater. She represented West Germany at the 1988 Winter Olympics and competed in the women's 1500m and in the women's 3000m speed skating events.

References

External links 

1967 births
Living people
German female speed skaters
Speed skaters at the 1988 Winter Olympics
Olympic speed skaters of West Germany